Rodney Scott (born February 17, 1978, in Washington, DC, U.S.) is an American actor best known for playing David Cassidy/Keith Partridge in the 1999 television movie Come On Get Happy: The Partridge Family Story, and William 'Will' Krudski, one of the leading characters in the TV series Young Americans, a role that originated as a recurring character on Dawson's Creek.

Scott also had a recurring guest-starring role on The District, and a multi-season recurring role on American Dreams. He was on The X-Files, on the 5th episode of the 7th season. He played the role of Scott Sawyer in Season 3, Episode 7 of Cold Case.

In 2011 he had a role in a game L.A. Noire, developed by Team Bondi and published by Rockstar Games. He was the voice of Officer Ralph Dunn, who was a partner of the main character, Cole Phelps.

References

External links

1978 births
Living people
Male actors from Washington, D.C.